The Acomé River is a river in Guatemala. It begins in the vicinity of Santa Lucia Cotzumalguapa, in the Escuintla Department, and runs southward, crossing the coastal plain of Escuintla to empty into the Pacific Ocean. The Acomé watershed has a population of about 53,510 people.

See also
List of rivers of Guatemala

References

Bibliography
Mapa de Cuencas y Ríos (INSIVUMEH)

Rand McNally, The New International Atlas, 1993.
CIA map: :Image:Guatemala geopolitical.jpg
UN map: :Image:Un-guatemala.png

Rivers of Guatemala